177 Franklin Street is a historic six-story commercial building located on Franklin Street between Hudson and Greenwich streets in the TriBeCa neighborhood of Manhattan in New York City. Originally built in 1888, 177 Franklin Street was owned by real estate investor William Grupe and designed by architect Frederick Jenth, with construction starting in 1887. The structure was originally designed as a five-story building; a sixth story was added in 1890 by architect Robert Callack.

The building has a neo-Grec façade composed of a one-story base and a five-story upper section. Some surviving historic features include a pressed metal cornice, prominent brick-and-stone lintels, a brick corbel table, wood sash windows, and cast-iron piers from the Lindsay, Graff & Megquier foundry, as indicated on two clear foundry marks. The building was renovated by Michael Kirchmann of GDSNY and is the headquarters and flagship location for lifestyle retailer Shinola.

See also
 New York City Landmarks Preservation Commission

References

1888 establishments in New York (state)
Buildings and structures completed in the 1880s
Commercial buildings completed in 1888
History of Manhattan
Commercial buildings in Manhattan
Tribeca